Lee Sung-yang (born 29 May 1922) is a Taiwanese entomologist. He was the subject of the 1975 BBC documentary The Insect World of Dr. Lee. In Taiwan, he is referred to as the "Taiwanese Jean Henri Fabre."

External links
Insects' Confidant: Sung-yang Lee

Possibly living people
1922 births
Taiwanese biologists
People from Chiayi County